Christopher Anvil (March 11, 1925 – November 30, 2009) is a pseudonym used by American author Harry Christopher Crosby.

Biography and work
Crosby was born in Norwich, Connecticut, the only child of Harry Clifton Crosby and Rose Glasbrenner. After serving as a pilot with the U.S. military, he began publishing science fiction with the story "Cinderella, Inc." in the December 1952 issue of the magazine Imagination.  By 1956, he had adopted his pseudonym Christopher Anvil and his science-fiction work was being published in Astounding. He went on to a long and successful career in the field.

His stories usually deal with characters in different human government organizations, dealing with adventures, gadgetry, and subterfuge both internal and external. His military background enabled him to bring a certain realism to his portrayal of action and intrigue, which counterpointed the more fantastical elements of his stories.

One of Anvil's best-known short stories is "Pandora's Planet", which appeared first in Astounding in September 1956, and has since been reprinted several times, including an appearance in the first volume of Anvil's works published in hardcover by Baen's Books, Pandora's Legions. It has also been "fixed-up" into a full-length novel.

Anvil's repeated appearances in Astounding/Analog in the 1950s and '60s were due in part to three factors. First was his ability to write stories which fitted with one of Astounding editor John W. Campbell's preferred approaches to plotting: alien opponents with superior firepower losing out to the superior intelligence or indomitable will of humans. Secondly, his stories are nearly always humorous throughout, and the humour is well done. Finally was his characterization and manner of story crafting, where his protagonists slid from disaster to disaster with the best of intentions, and through exercise of fast thinking, managed to snatch victory somehow from the jaws of defeat.

His stories became a perennial favorite with readers, and then in 1966... "he hit a winning streak in the late 1960s in a series which seemed straight out of Star Trek ... The Interstellar Patrol". The bulk of Anvil's published writing consists of short stories, but these can be read in sequence according to the in-world timeline, as is now arranged in the two collections of The Interstellar Patrol.

Many of his nonseries stories are almost purely idea-driven science fiction.  Some of the most striking of these, for example "Gadget vs. Trend", entirely lack dialogue and almost entirely lack characters; these stories consist of a series of newspaper reports or other similar materials.  In these and other stories, Anvil's technique is to put forth a gadget, invention, or social trend and logically develop the consequences.

Modern reprints
Like the work of many 20th century science fiction writers, all of Anvil's work has recently become available again by print-on-demand and ebooks. According to David Weber, who acknowledges being influenced by Anvil in the introduction to the anthology Interstellar Patrol:

Anvil also published a number of stories taking place within the Federation of Humanity (The term originates in the sub-title of the third anthology title released by Baen: Interstellar Patrol II, "The Federation of Humanity").
 Anvil himself, as well as John Campbell, referred to these stories as the Colonization Series prior to their being released as collections.

Bibliography

References

External links

Bibliography at SciFan
Baen Books by Anvil and Books by Anvil in the Baen Free Library.
Bibliography including short fiction at scifi-fantasy-info.com

1925 births
2009 deaths
20th-century American male writers
20th-century American novelists
20th-century American short story writers
20th-century pseudonymous writers
21st-century American male writers
21st-century American novelists
21st-century American short story writers
21st-century pseudonymous writers
American male novelists
American male short story writers
American science fiction writers
Analog Science Fiction and Fact people
Novelists from Connecticut